Erika Géczi (born 10 March 1959) is a retired Hungarian sprint canoer who competed in the 1980s. She won a silver medal in the K-4 500 m event at the 1988 Summer Olympics, as well as six medals at the ICF Canoe Sprint World Championships with a gold (K-4 500 m: 1986), three silvers (K-2 500 m: 1982, 1983; K-4 500 m: 1987), and two bronzes (K-4 500 m: 1982, 1985).

Géczi is an accomplished rock musician and singer who performed with the Hungarian bands Sextett, Rockfort, Kormorán and Örökség.

References

DatabaseOlympics.com profile

1959 births
Canoeists from Budapest
Canoeists at the 1988 Summer Olympics
Hungarian female canoeists
Living people
Olympic canoeists of Hungary
Olympic silver medalists for Hungary
Olympic medalists in canoeing
Medalists at the 1988 Summer Olympics
ICF Canoe Sprint World Championships medalists in kayak
Musicians from Budapest